A Merry Little Christmas is the first Christmas release by Canadian singer-songwriter Matt Brouwer. The seven song collection was released on December 7, 2010, through Universal Music Distribution. The album includes "Angels Sing", an original composition written by Brouwer, as well as a cover of the Goo Goo Dolls hit "Better Days" that charted for Brouwer on the Billboard Christian chart in January 2011. Brouwer's version of the song was added to regular, non-seasonal CCM playlists on Air1 and KLOVE Christian stations throughout the following year.

Track listing

Charts

References

External links
 [ Billboard.com]

2010 Christmas albums
Matt Brouwer albums